Georges Berthet (18 September 1903 – 14 August 1979) was a French sportsman who took part in the 1924 Winter Olympics in Chamonix and the 1928 Olympics in Amsterdam.

Berthet was born in Les Rousses. In 1923 he was French Nordic combined champion and seventh in the international ranking of ski jumping. He won an Olympic bronze medal at the 1924 Winter Olympics in Chamonix. He was part of the French team which came in third place in the military patrol behind Switzerland and Finland. Six teams took part in the event on 31 January 1924 but only four completed the course. The others in the team were Camille Mandrillon, Adrien Vandelle and Maurice Mandrillon. He died in Morez.

External links

References 

1903 births
1979 deaths
French male rowers
French military patrol (sport) runners
French male ski jumpers
Olympic biathletes of France
Military patrol competitors at the 1924 Winter Olympics
Olympic bronze medalists for France
People from Les Rousses
Medalists at the 1924 Winter Olympics
Sportspeople from Jura (department)